Gino Fano (5 January 18718 November 1952) was an Italian mathematician, best known as the founder of finite geometry. He was born to a wealthy Jewish family in Mantua, in Italy and died in Verona, also in Italy.

Fano made various contributions on projective and algebraic geometry. His work in the foundations of geometry predates the similar, but more popular, work of David Hilbert by about a decade.

He was the father of physicist Ugo Fano and electrical engineer Robert Fano and uncle to physicist and mathematician Giulio Racah.

Mathematical work
Fano was an early writer in the area of finite projective spaces. In his article on proving the independence of his set of axioms for projective n-space, among other things, he considered the consequences of having a fourth harmonic point be equal to its conjugate. This leads to a configuration of seven points and seven lines contained in a finite three-dimensional space with 15 points, 35 lines and 15 planes, in which each line contained only three points.

All the planes in this space consist of seven points and seven lines and are now known as Fano planes:

Fano went on to describe finite projective spaces of arbitrary dimension and prime orders.

In 1907 Gino Fano contributed two articles to Part III of Klein's encyclopedia. The first (SS. 221–88) was a comparison of analytic geometry and synthetic geometry through their historic development in the 19th century. The second (SS. 282–388) was on continuous groups in geometry and group theory as a unifying principle in geometry.

Notes

References

External links 
 
 

1871 births
1952 deaths
Scientists from Mantua
19th-century Italian mathematicians
20th-century Italian mathematicians
Algebraic geometers
Italian algebraic geometers
20th-century Italian Jews